Friederike Kempter (born 23 August 1979) is a German actress.  Her acting credits include films like Pandorum and A Coffee in Berlin as well as television shows like Ladykracher and Hauptstadtrevier. She has played Police Kommissar Nadeshda Krusenstern in the Thiel and Boerne Tatort episodes since 2002.

Filmography (selection) 
 Moianacht (2000)
 Tatort (TV series, since 2002)
 Eight Miles High (2007)
 Vollidiot (2007)
 Ladykracher (TV series, 2008–2012)
 Pandorum (2009)
 Kokowääh (2011)
 What a Man (2011)
 Men Do What They Can (2012)
 A Coffee In Berlin (2012)
 Heiter bis tödlich: Hauptstadtrevier (TV series, since 2012)
 SMS für Dich (2016)
 Goodbye Berlin (2016)

Audiobooks
2016: Charlotte Link, Die Entscheidung, Random House Audio,

References

External links
 

1979 births
Living people
Actresses from Stuttgart
German film actresses